Ger Reidy (Irish: Gearóid Ó Riada), is a GAA goalkeeper currently playing for Castleisland Desmonds and Kerry. He made his intercounty debut in the National League fixture vs. Donegal in Austin Stack Park, Tralee.  He went on to play in 3 further matches in Kerry's ultimately successful 2009 Allianz National Football League Division 1 campaign against Derry, Westmeath and Galway conceding only one goal (to Galway).

For Kerry's 2009 All-Ireland Senior Football Championship campaign he was substitute goalkeeper and although he made no appearance, as a member of the winning squad, he gained his first All Ireland Senior Football medal.

Following the retirement of Diarmuid Murphy he was widely tipped as a front runner for the No 1 shirt and started out the year by winning a McGrath Cup medal when Kerry overcame UCC in the final. He lined out for Kerry against Dublin in the opening match of the 2010 NFL campaign. However on 10 March 2010 he announced his resignation from the Kerry squad.

In October 2010, Ger was part of the Castleisland Desmonds squad who would go on to win RTÉ's Celebrity Bainisteoir competition, beating Ballymun Kickhams in a thrilling final at Parnell Park, Dublin.

In 2012 Ger was goalkeeper for Kingdom Kerry Gaels, a Senior London side based in the north of the city. Despite good team performances in all competitions that year, Ger was part of the losing side in the London Senior Football Final in Ruislip against rivals Tir Chonaill Gaels. He currently plays for Castleisland Desmonds.

Achievements
 All-Ireland Senior Football Championship, 2009
 Allianz National Football League Div.1, 2009
 McGrath Cup 2010
 North Kerry Senior Football Championship, 2007
 RTÉ Celebrity Bainistéoir, 2010

References

1986 births
Living people
Castleisland Gaelic footballers
Gaelic football goalkeepers
Kerry inter-county Gaelic footballers
Place of birth missing (living people)